Magnus Wikström (born 7 December 1977) is a Swedish former footballer.

References

External links
 

1977 births
Örebro SK players
GIF Sundsvall players
Gefle IF players
Allsvenskan players
Superettan players
Swedish footballers
Living people
BK Forward players
Association football defenders